Chembe District is a district of Zambia, located in Luapula Province. The capital lies at Chembe. It was created in 2012 by splitting Mansa District.

References

Districts of Luapula Province